Ha Dong-hoon (born on August 20, 1979), better known by his stage name Haha, is a South Korean singer, rapper, variety show host and member of RGP. He is best known for being in the sitcom, Nonstop and for co-hosting two popular variety programs, MBC's Infinite Challenge and SBS's Running Man.  He has also hosted his own show, titled "Ya Man TV" on Mnet in 2015.

Life and career

2000–2008: Debut and rising popularity
Haha was born on August 20, 1979, in Stuttgart, Baden-Württemberg, West Germany and moved to Seoul, South Korea when he was an infant. His parents are both Korean, with his mother holding a doctorate in psychology, and he has an older sister, Ha Juri who is a pianist, also with a doctorate. Haha graduated from Daejin University, where he had obtained a master's degree in Drama and Fine Arts. He later signed to Seoul Records and debuted as a singer and rapper in 2001 with hip hop group, Z-kiri. Despite excessive promotion, Z-kiri failed to get popular and was quickly disbanded.

In 2002, Haha became a co-host for the show, What's Up YO! alongside MC Mong and Jerome To. The three later became known as the "What's Up Trio" because of their strong friendship on-screen. Haha later joined the main cast of the third season of Nonstop, a sitcom about a group of college students and their friends and family. He remained a part of the cast up until 2003 which managed to gain him recognition for his acting and comedy skills. Haha later became the producer and presenter for his own radio show with MC Mong, known as Haha and Mong's Journey in 2004 for SBS Power FM.

After leaving Nonstop, Haha spent two years alongside singer Taw, to prepare and record his debut album titled, "The Beautiful Rhyme Diary". The album was released on February 18, 2005, alongside his debut single, "Love Song" but it failed to chart or garner popularity. He eventually guested on X-man on May 22, 2005, and became popular for his imitations of close friend, Kim Jong-kook. His sudden popularity spike allowed him to become a regular guest for X-man, arguably the biggest variety show of that time.

Thanks to his rising popularity, Haha was added to the cast of MBC's Infinite Challenge by December 2005 as the part of the program's format changes under new the PD of the program, Kim Tae-ho. By the time Season 3 aired in 2006, the concept and format of "variety & reality program" became very popular, and Infinite Challenge became the forerunner of many programs that followed with the same or similar format. Since December 2, 2006, the program has received the highest ratings of prime-time lineups for Saturday evening. In his final episode before entering the service, Haha performed at a guerilla concert at Yeouido Park that was secretly organized by his fellow co-hosts.

He also returned as a guest for the sixth and final season of Nonstop in 2006. In 2007, Haha released his second single, "You're My Destiny" which took samples from the song "Stand by Me" by Ben E. King. The single managed to reach number one on the Gaon Chart and he performed it on his Comeback Stage on Music Bank in November. Haha later joined the show, Happy Shares Company as a co-host until February 2008.

2008–present: Military service, Running Man, and career in music
In February 2008, Haha temporarily left Infinite Challenge  in order to serve his national service in the army. Previous reports had stated that he had been attempting to evade his military service. However, these reports were confirmed to be false and Haha's service had only been postponed. During his service, he collaborated with a new group Davichi for their song "Love and War". After 24 months of serving the military, on March 11, 2010, he was discharged.

After finishing his military service, Haha returned as a cast of Infinite Challenge following requests from his fellow co-hosts, Yoo Jae-suk and Noh Hong-chul. He also made regular guest appearances on Yoo Jae-suk's talk show Come to Play and was also the co-host of the Haha-Mong Show with MC Mong up until allegations sprung up that MC Mong had attempted to evade his military service. Since 2010, Haha is one of the co-hosts for SBS variety show, Running Man. On December 30, 2011, Haha received the award for "Best Entertainer" during the 2011 SBS Entertainment Awards for his work on ''Running Man''. He also performed his single, "Rosa" during the award ceremony.

In 2012, he continued his musical career by collaborating on a mini-album, "Skull & Haha Ya Man", with fellow reggae artist Skull, who was previously with Stony Skunk. The two performed one of its tracks, "Busan Vacance" on several TV music shows, and Haha performed the song along with other cast members during fan meets for the Running Man show. In 2012 he was also featured along with Gary, on their fellow Running Man cast member Kim Jong-kook's comeback album, "Volume 7 – Journey Home" in the song "Words I Want to Say to You".

In 2013, Haha collaborated with Skull once again, on a single titled "돈암동 멜로디" as well as an EP titled "REGGAErilla". Also, Haha and his wife welcomed their first son, Ha Dream, on July 9 on that year.

In 2014, he and Kim Jong-kook formed a musical duo, Running Man Brothers, and visited the United States for a concert tour, in July and December.

In 2016, Haha collaborated with Skull on a single titled "Love Inside", featuring Stephen Marley. The song ranked in the top ten of a Jamaican video chart when it was released. He has 2 new variety shows: Talking Road and Rebound. In addition, he will be hosting alongside Jeong Jun-ha for a new high school rap battle show, to be aired on Mnet in 2017.

In 2018, Haha had decided to resign as the CEO of Quan Entertainment and his longtime manager, Jang Hyung-chul will be taking over the position.

On December 8, 2021, Haha released his second extended play Gap, the first for 10 years since Quan Ninomarley A.K.A HaHa Reggae Wave in 2011.

Personal life
On August 15, 2012, it was announced that he was going to marry South Korean singer Byul.  The couple married on November 30, 2012. The couple welcomed their first child, Dream, on July 9, 2013. Their second son, Soul, was born on March 22, 2017. Their third child, a daughter, Song, was born on July 15, 2019.

Filmography

Film

Television series

Television host

Current programs

Former programs

Web shows

Discography

Studio albums

Collaborative albums

Extended plays

Charted singles

As featuring artist

Music video appearances

Commercials 

 2002: 700–5425
 2003: OTTOGI CORPORATION 3Minute
 2003: Binggrae
 2007: Lotte Card CO., LTD.
 2008: TriGem Computer Inc.
 2010: Shinhan Financial Group Co., Ltd.
 2012: SKY
 2013: Coca-Cola
 2013: BRINICLE
 2014: Coca-Cola
 2018: K-Fresh Zone (With Lee Kwang-soo)

Awards and nominations

References

External links

 Official Website
  
 
 
 
 KBS World Biography 

1979 births
Infinite Challenge members
Living people
Reggae fusion artists
South Korean male film actors
South Korean male rappers
South Korean male television actors
South Korean pop singers
South Korean record producers
South Korean television presenters
South Korean reggae musicians